Cal Crutchlow (born 29 October 1985) is an English professional motorcycle racer who retired from regular competition after the 2020 season. He is contracted as a test rider for Yamaha Motor Racing, which he is expected to continue in 2022 and 2023. During 2021 he returned to race for two Yamaha teams as a replacement rider in four MotoGP events, and will replace Andrea Dovizioso for the last six events of 2022 after Dovizioso's retirement announced mid-season.

After winning the 2006 British Supersport Championship, he became the Supersport World Championship champion in 2009 with Yamaha. He also won races in the British Superbike Championship finishing 3rd in 2008 and in the Superbike World Championship finishing 5th in 2010.

In 2011, Crutchlow joined the MotoGP World Championship with Monster Yamaha Tech 3. In , Crutchlow managed four podium finishes, a points tally of 188 and finished 5th in the overall standings as the top satellite (non-factory) rider. This earned him a move to the factory Ducati team in  finishing 13th in the championship with a podium finish in Aragon. After one season with Ducati, Crutchlow moved to LCR Honda in 2015. He won the 2016 Czech Republic motorcycle Grand Prix becoming the first Briton since Barry Sheene in 1981 to win a premier class race, which he followed up with another win in Australia.

In early 2017, the RAC awarded Crutchlow the Torrens Trophy, an accolade made in recognition of "outstanding contribution to motorcycling in the United Kingdom".

Career

Early career
Born in Coventry, England, he was named Cal after the American motorcycle racer Cal Rayborn. Although his father Derek was a racer, he did not become interested in the sport himself until age 11. As of 2007 he did not hold a motorcycle licence for the road. He had football trials with Coventry City and Aston Villa as a youth, but after a knee injury chose to concentrate on motorcycle racing.

Crutchlow won the UK Junior Challenge in 1999, and the Aprilia RS125 Challenge in 2001. He was runner-up in the 2003 Yamaha R6 Cup behind Tommy Hill, who earned a factory sponsored ride in the British Superbike series for this achievement.

He won the British Supersport Championship in 2006, after a 3-year stint in the series in which he finished 3rd in 2005.

British Superbike Championship

For 2007 he made his debut in the prestigious British Superbike Championship, with the Rizla Suzuki team alongside four-time runner-up Chris Walker. He took pole at Croft, and finished 9th overall after finishing the season with his first podium, third at Brands Hatch. For 2008 he moved to HM Plant Honda, sponsored by CIA Insurance. He took his first series win in race 2 at Thruxton. He took pole for round 3 at Oulton Park – he led race 1 before running wide in damp conditions, and crashed heavily out of 2nd place in race 2, injuring his ankle in the process. After initially having the better of teammate Leon Haslam, Crutchlow was ultimately outpointed by him. He took two wins in the season, and finished 3rd overall in the championship, beating Tom Sykes by two points after the Yorkshireman had a late mechanical failure in the final round.

Supersport World Championship

On 23 September 2008, it was confirmed that Crutchlow had signed a deal to ride for the Wilco Zeelenberg-managed Yamaha factory team in the 2009 World Supersport Championship. He finished in the top four at every race until a mechanical failure while leading at Brno, and found himself in a two-way championship dice with surprise package Eugene Laverty on a Parkalgar Honda. Crutchlow lead the championship until a gearbox failure while leading at Imola meant that Eugene Laverty moved to within 3 points. However, at Magny-Cours after an intense start Laverty crashed, but picked his bike back up to leave him 19 points behind Crutchlow with 1 race at Portimão left. Laverty won in Portugal, but a fourth place by Crutchlow was enough to secure him the 2009 championship.

Superbike World Championship

On 1 October 2009 Yamaha announced that Crutchlow would make the move from World Supersport to the Superbike World Championship in 2010. His teammate was former world champion James Toseland, who rejoined the Superbike World Championship after losing his place in MotoGP. He took his first series pole at his second meeting, at Portimão, but did not win either race. He stoked controversy after the first race there by mentioning in an interview that he was well clear of Toseland when he crashed out, but insists that he is not arrogant. Toseland later pointed out that Crutchlow's tendency to speak his mind means that not everybody can get on with him. Crutchlow took his first two World Superbike wins at Silverstone, after battling with Ten Kate Racing rider Jonathan Rea, and as a result climbed from tenth to fifth in the standings.

MotoGP World Championship

Monster Yamaha Tech 3 (2011–2013)

It was officially announced on 5 September 2010 that Crutchlow would join Tech 3 for the 2011 MotoGP Championship. Crutchlow ended the season in 12th position in the championship, and sealed the Rookie of the Year Award after achieving his best result of the season – fourth place – in Valencia.

After a successful period in the winter testing for the 2012 season, Crutchlow got off to a good start. In Losail, Crutchlow secured 3rd position on the starting grid, and went on to achieve 4th place ahead of teammate Andrea Dovizioso, matching his previous best finish in Valencia last year. Following his first front-row qualifying, his father lost a bet with Wilco Zeelenberg and had to shave off his 40-year-old moustache. Crutchlow again suffered disappointment at Silverstone during practice for the British Grand Prix when he crashed at Chapel Corner. Early x-rays showed no break to his ankle, however it was clear Crutchlow was in considerable pain. Further examination showed a broken and dislocated left ankle, and raised questions over Crutchlow's participation in the race. He was given the all clear by doctors, and passed a fitness test at the circuit. Starting at the back of the grid, Crutchlow raced with characteristic determination, and finished in a highly commendable 6th place. Overall Crutchlow had a very positive season, finishing seventh in the championship, running consistently within the top-five riders and obtaining two podium finishes – third place on both occasions – in the Czech Republic and in Australia.
After another positive season in 2013, Crutchlow finished fifth in the championship with 188 points.  He obtained four podium finishes, with second places in France and Germany, and third places in Italy and the Netherlands. He also achieved the first pole position of his career at Assen. Crutchlow battled consistently among the second group of riders, along with Andrea Dovizioso, Stefan Bradl and Álvaro Bautista.

Ducati Team (2014)

On 2 August 2013 it was announced that Crutchlow had signed a two-year deal with the factory Ducati team, to partner Andrea Dovizioso. The beginning of his season was plagued with issues. A malfunctioning transponder caused the electronics of his Ducati Desmosedici to behave strangely during the first race in Qatar, where he finished in sixth place. He experienced tyre issues and later crashed out of the race in Austin. In the crash he suffered a hand injury, causing him to miss the Argentine Grand Prix and thus missing a championship race for the first time in his career. He returned in Jerez, but he was forced to retire after three laps, having experienced problems with the brakes.

On 2 August 2014, exactly a year after joining the team, it was announced that Crutchlow was leaving Ducati. Later the same day, it was announced that Crutchlow had signed for LCR Honda for the 2015 season, riding the factory-specification RC213V, replacing Stefan Bradl. He achieved his first podium with Ducati in Aragon, finishing in third place.

LCR Honda (2015–2020)

Crutchlow started the 2015 season with CWM LCR Honda by taking seventh-place finishes in Qatar and Austin. He then achieved his first podium with the team, with a third-place result in Argentina after a last-lap pass on Andrea Iannone. In the process, Crutchlow achieved LCR's first podium since Stefan Bradl finished second at the 2013 United States Grand Prix. Crutchlow retired from each of the next three races on the calendar, in France, Italy and Catalunya, before a sixth-place finish in the Netherlands and adding a seventh-place finish in Germany. Crutchlow finished eighth in the championship.

Crutchlow won his first race at the wet 2016 Czech Republic GP. This win ended a 35-year dry spell as the last win by a British rider in the top flight was Barry Sheene at the 1981 Swedish Grand Prix. He also won the Australian GP, his first dry win. He became the first Briton ever to win the Australian Grand Prix. He ended the year with 141 points, finishing seventh in the championship.

Crutchlow crashed at out at the 2017 season opener in Qatar, but rallied at the second race in Argentina to take a podium in 3rd place. He followed this up with two top five finishes in his next three races to produce a solid start to the season.
He extended his contract with LCR and Honda until 2019.

In 2018, Crutchlow achieved his 3rd career MotoGP win in Argentina. With a total of 3 podiums and 148 points, he finished 7th in the championship, despite missing the final 3 races of the season due to injury.

For 2019, Crutchlow again had 3 podiums and finished consistently in the points. However 6 retirements relegated him to just 9th in the riders' championship.

Yamaha Motor Racing
In November 2020, it was announced Crutchlow was contracted for the 2021 season as a test rider with the Monster Energy Yamaha factory team replacing Jorge Lorenzo.

In August of the  season, Yamaha arranged for race entries with Crutchlow riding for the satellite team Petronas Yamaha SRT in the Styrian race (Austria), replacing Franco Morbidelli, who was recovering from knee surgery, on Morbidelli's regular 2019 machine. Crutchlow finished in seventeenth place out of 18 finishers. In the following weekend's race also in Austria, he finished in seventeenth place out of 17 finishers. In late August 2021 he also rode for the Yamaha factory team at the British Grand Prix as a replacement, finishing in position 17.

Personal life
Crutchlow married Lucy Heron in January, 2014, announcing on Twitter that he and Lucy welcomed their first child, a girl named Willow, on 2 August 2016.

He is based in Ramsey, Isle of Man, but spends his time during the racing season in Tuscany, where he has owned a home since 2012. Crutchlow has ridden several exhibition laps around the Isle of Man TT Course.

In late 2018 Crutchlow suffered severe lower-leg injuries in a crash at Phillip Island, Australia. He has a home in California and spends time there during the northern-hemisphere winter when there is no racing.

Career statistics

All-time statistics

Races by year

British Supersport Championship
(key) 

* Both Easton and Cal Crutchlow finished on 161 thus sharing 3rd place.

British Superbike Championship
(key)

Supersport World Championship
(key) (Races in bold indicate pole position; races in italics indicate fastest lap)

Superbike World Championship
(key) (Races in bold indicate pole position; races in italics indicate fastest lap)

Grand Prix motorcycle racing

By season

By class

Races by year
(key) (Races in bold indicate pole position; races in italics indicate fastest lap)

References

External links

British motorcycle racers
English motorcycle racers
British Supersport Championship riders
British Superbike Championship riders
Supersport World Championship riders
1985 births
Living people
Sportspeople from Coventry
Ducati Corse MotoGP riders
Superbike World Championship riders
Tech3 MotoGP riders
LCR Team MotoGP riders
MotoGP World Championship riders
Sepang Racing Team MotoGP riders
Yamaha Motor Racing MotoGP riders
RNF Racing MotoGP riders